Brit Awards 2012  was held on 21 February 2012. This was the 32nd edition of the British Phonographic Industry's annual Brit Awards. The awards ceremony was held at The O2 Arena in London for the second time. The ceremony was presented by James Corden. Leading the nominations was Ed Sheeran with four, followed by Adele and Jessie J with three, whilst Bon Iver, Aloe Blacc, Coldplay and Florence and the Machine all had two.

Amy Winehouse and Whitney Houston received remembrance tributes due to their deaths in July 2011 and February 2012, respectively. Adele picked up two awards for Best British Album and British Female, whilst Sheeran also won two awards for Best British Male and British Breakthrough. Blur received the Outstanding Contribution to Music award. The statue was designed by Peter Blake.

Performances

Winners and nominees

Outstanding Contribution to Music
 Blur (presented by Ray Winstone)

Multiple nominations and awards

Acceptance speech controversy

Adele and Blur
Adele was cut off by host James Corden during her acceptance speech for the MasterCard British Album of the Year award, causing her to "give the finger" on national television. Adele stated that the gesture was aimed at "the suits", not her fans. ITV issued an apology to the show as a spokesman for the network stated:

Corden was also upset by the occurrence, stating afterwards:

Due to the over-running, Blur's set was also cut off, prior to their performance of "Tender".

Emeli Sandé
There was more controversy later on in the show when Emeli Sandé wasn't allowed to give a speech after winning the Critic's Choice Award. Sandé was said to be distressed by the bosses of the show and also angry after Adele got an apology for being cut off, whereas she did not. During the presentation of the award, previous winner Jessie J was asked to give her advice on her career instead of Sandé giving a speech. A friend of Sandé's said to the Daily Record:

A spokesman for ITV later gave an apology to Sandé, stating:

References

External links
Brit Awards 2012 at Brits.co.uk

Brit Awards
Brit Awards
Brit Awards
BRIT Awards
Brit Awards
Brit Awards